Bentgate or Bent Gate may refer to several places in the United Kingdom:
 Bentgate, Rochdale, an area of Newhey
 Bent Gate, a suburb of Haslingden, Lancashire
 Bentgate, home of Haslingden Cricket Club